Smart beta investment portfolios are long-only rules-based investment strategies that aim to outperform a capitalization-weighted benchmark. A comprehensive analysis of smart beta strategies has found that smart beta strategies have underperformed by 1% on average since launch.

The term smart beta was originally coined by Willis Towers Watson in 2006.

Demand for smart beta 
Smart beta strategies have generated considerable interest from institutional investors in the wake of the 2008 financial crisis. According to ETF.com, as of April 2019 there was approximately $880 billion invested in smart beta funds. The increase in demand has led to an increase in the number of products and there are more than 1000 smart beta ETFs on the market today. The demand/growth does not appear to be slowing down; in the 12-month period ending February 2019 77 new smart beta ETFs launched accounting for roughly 1/3 of all ETFs launched in the 12 month period. According to Morningstar, there were 632 strategic-beta exchange traded products at the end of June 2020 with $869.7 billion in assets.

Product landscape  
Asset managers including BlackRock, Legg Mason, Henderson Rowe, Invesco and WisdomTree all operate smart beta funds. To identify which type of smart beta provides the best fit, qualified institutional investors need to understand the expected return and risk for each of their active, passive, and smart beta allocations.

Common factor based smart beta types revolve around six ideas for optimization (source: FTSE):
  Liquidity: Amihud ratio – median ratio of absolute daily return to daily traded value over the previous year
  Momentum: residual Sharpe ratio
  Quality: composite of profitability (return on assets), efficiency (change in asset turnover), earnings quality (accruals) & leverage
  Size: full market capitalization
  Value: composite of trailing cash-flow yield, earnings yield and country relative sales to price ratio
 Volatility: standard deviation of five years of weekly (wed/wed) local total returns

External links 
 MSCI Research Insight Foundations of Factor Investing

References 

Investment
Portfolio theories